Pater Sigbert Wagener (OFMCap) (29 October 1919 in Krefeld as Karl Emil Wagener – 13 April 2004) was a German Capuchin priest, a teacher, a scientist and naturalist especially interested in entomology.
He wrote (partial list)
 Monographie der ostasiatischen Formen der Gattung Melanargia Meigen (Lepidoptera, Satyridae) Lfg.1, Schweizerbart 1959
 Monographie der ostasiatischen Formen der Gattung Melanargia Meigen (Lepidoptera, Satyridae) Lfg. 2, Schweizerbart 1959
 Monographie der ostasiatischen Formen der Gattung Melanargia Meigen (Lepidoptera, Satyridae) Lfg. 3, Schweizerbart 1959
 Bemerkungen zu den Parnassius-Formen des Appenin aus geographisch-ökologischer Sicht (Papilionidae) Nota lepid. 1 (1) 23–37 1977
Die Tagfalter der Türkei unter Berücksichtigung der angrenzenden Länder, with Gerhard Hesselbarth, Harry van Oorschot, Goecke & Evers 1995,

References

External links
lepidopterology.com Biography, full bibliography, taxa named for him.

German lepidopterists
Officers Crosses of the Order of Merit of the Federal Republic of Germany
Members of the Order of Merit of North Rhine-Westphalia
1919 births
2004 deaths
Capuchins
20th-century German zoologists